Sincik is a town of Adıyaman Province of Turkey. It is the seat of Sincik District. The town is populated by Kurds of the Reşwan tribe and had a population of 4,344 in 2021. The mayor is Mehmet Korkut (BBP).

The town is divided into the neighborhoods of Ayengin, Cumhuriyet, Fatih, Karaman, Mahmutoğlu (Serindere), Onur and Zeynel Aslan.

References

Populated places in Adıyaman Province
Sincik District
Kurdish settlements in Adıyaman Province